The 2001 World Indoor Target Archery Championships were held in Florence, Italy from 19–24 March 2001.

Medal summary (Men's individual)

Medal summary (Women's individual)

Medal summary (Men's team)

Medal summary (Women's team)

References

E
World Indoor Archery Championships
2001 in Italian sport
International archery competitions hosted by Italy